Transaviabaltika is a Lithuanian EASA approved commercial airline based at Kaunas International Airport (EYKA).

Transaviabaltika operates with Jetstream-31/32 aircraft types (2 aircraft in service). Currently, airline provides PSO services to the island of Hiiumaa in Estonia. Transaviabaltika also operates Savonlinna - Helsinki - Savonlinna PSO passenger routing on daily basis, as well as Helsinki - Tallinn - Helsinki passenger charter flights.  The company terminated their Savonlinna - Helsinki - Savonlinna PSO contract in early December 2022, with last flights taking place on 16 December 2022. The airline previously provided various charter cargo flights in Europe for UPS, TNT & DHL.

Fleet

Destinations

Estonia 
 Kärdla Airport (passenger flights, air taxi)
 Tallinn Airport (passenger flights, air taxi)

Finland 
 Savonlinna Airport (passenger flights, air taxi)
 Helsinki-Vantaa Airport (passenger flights, air taxi)

References

External links

Airlines of Lithuania
Airlines established in 1998
Lithuanian companies established in 1998